Prestosuchidae (in its widest usage) is a polyphyletic grouping of carnivorous archosaurs that lived during the Triassic. They succeeded the Erythrosuchidae as the largest archosaurs of their time. While resembling erythrosuchids in size and some features of the skull and skeleton, they were more advanced in their erect posture and crocodile-like ankle, indicating more efficient gait. "Prestosuchids" flourished throughout the whole of the middle, and the early part of the late Triassic, and fossils are so far known from Europe, India, Africa (Tanzania), Argentina, and Paleorrota in Brazil. However, for a long time experts disagree regarding the phylogenetic relationships of the group, what genera should be included, and whether indeed the "Prestosuchidae" constitute a distinct family.

In 2011, Prestosuchidae in its broadest definition was determined to be a poorly-diagnosed and obsolete polyphyletic group of pseudosuchians (crocodilian-lineage archosaurs) leading to the more "advanced" rauisuchids and crocodylomorphs. Some studies since then have reintroduced the term Prestosuchidae in a more limited setting. In these studies it refers to a clade containing Prestosuchus, Saurosuchus, and Luperosuchus. Even so, the validity of this clade is unclear, and it is often not supported over a paraphyletic arrangement of its constituents.

Classification
In 1957, Alan Charig proposed a new family, the Prestosuchidae, to include genera like Mandasuchus, Prestosuchus, and Spondylosoma. In 1967, Alfred Sherwood Romer placed Saurosuchus and Rauisuchus within Erythrosuchidae and adopted the Prestosuchidae to include Prestosuchus, Procerosuchus, and Mandasuchus.

Prestosuchidae have often been included within Rauisuchidae, although they have sometimes considered the sister group of the aetosaurs in a monophyletic Pseudosuchia, or as a small clade intermediate between basal Crurotarsi and more advanced archosaurs such as the Aetosauridae and Rauisuchidae. J. Michael Parrish's 1993 cladistic analysis of crocodylotarsan archosaurs places the Prestosuchidae (including Prestosuchus, Ticinosuchus, and Saurosuchus) outside the crocodylomorph - poposaurid - rauisuchid - aetosaur clade. In most cladograms, Prestosuchids are considered more derived than phytosaurs and ornithosuchids, but usually less derived than the poposaurids and aetosaurs.

A 2011 study of archosaurs by Sterling Nesbitt found that prestosuchidae is a polyphyletic group of various unrelated suchians. For example, Ticinosuchus was found to be the sister taxon to paracrocodylomorpha while Prestosuchus and Saurosuchus were basal loricatans. The study determined that many of the characteristics previously used to define prestosuchidae were present in a wide variety of pseudosuchians. Although Parrish used many traits of the ankle to characterize prestosuchids, Nesbitt showed that these traits were present in various basal suchian groups. In 2004, Benton proposed another trait to define Prestosuchidae: a narrow, triangular antorbital fenestra. However, Nesbitt found this trait in Postosuchus (a rauisuchid), Dromicosuchus (a crocodylomorph), and Fasolasuchus (a basal loricatan).

Evolution of the group
The earliest known "prestosuchid" is Mandasuchus from the Anisian of Tanzania.  This was already a large animal, about 4.75 meters long. A similar but smaller form (perhaps the same genus) is Ticinosuchus of the Middle Triassic (Anisian-Ladinian) of Switzerland and Northern Italy, which was about 2.5 meters in length. The huge (6 meters long) Batrachotomus from the latest Middle Triassic (Late Ladinian) of Germany, and Prestosuchus of the early Late Triassic (Carnian) of Brazil may have been closely related animals. Yarasuchus, a lightly built archosaur from the Middle Triassic of India, was once assigned to this group, although a 2017 study placed it as an avemetatarsalian in the newly defined group Aphanosauria. Finally, Saurosuchus was a huge carnivore, 6 or 7 meters long, whose fossils are known from the Late Carnian of Argentina.

List of genera

References

 Sereno, P. C. 2005. Stem Archosauria—TaxonSearch [version 1.0, 7 November 2005]

External links

 Taxon Search - Prestosuchidae
 Rauisuchiformes: Prestosuchidae at Palaeos

 
Middle Triassic first appearances
Late Triassic extinctions
Apex predators
Prehistoric reptile families